Louis Kozma (1 March 1938 – 16 August 1990) was a Belgian swimmer. He competed in the men's 200 metre breaststroke at the 1956 Summer Olympics.

References

External links
 

1938 births
1990 deaths
Belgian male breaststroke swimmers
Olympic swimmers of Belgium
Swimmers at the 1956 Summer Olympics